25th Airborne Special Forces Brigade, or the ''NOHED Brigade''', is an airborne, special forces unit of the Iranian Army established in 1959.

The unit's first operation was during the Dhofar Rebellion in Oman. After the 1979 Revolution in Iran, it was a participant in the post-Revolution clashes. As part of the 21st Commando Division, the unit was extensively used in various operations of the Iran–Iraq War of the 1980s. Recently, some members have been active in the Syrian Civil War. The brigade has also been employed for hostage rescue and counter-terrorism purposes inside Iran.25th Takavar Brigade is a Takavar separate brigade of the Ground Forces of Islamic Republic of Iran Army based in Pasveh, West Azerbaijan Province.
The unit supplied aid for 2012 East Azerbaijan earthquakes.

References 

Special forces of Iran
Military special forces brigades
Military units and formations of Ground Forces of Islamic Republic of Iran Army
Piranshahr County